Chevy, el Ponzoñú is a fictional Puerto Rican television character, played by Puerto Rican comedian Melwin Cedeño. He made his debut on Puerto Rican TV in 1990. He is a native of Ponce, Puerto Rico.

Comedy television characters
Ponce, Puerto Rico